White Jamaicans (also known as European-Jamaicans) are Jamaican people whose ancestry lies within the continent of Europe, most notably Great Britain and Ireland. There are also communities of people who are descendants of people who arrived from Spain, Germany and Portugal.

Historically, white Jamaicans made up a much larger percentage of the population.  They would go on to be the majority, at least for most of the 17th century, after Jamaica was conquered by the British. Initially, the Spanish colonized the island in the 1600s and, subsequently, the English began taking an interest in it. Following a failed attempt to conquer Santo Domingo on Hispaniola, Admiral William Penn and General Robert Venables led an invasion of Jamaica, in 1655. The Spanish left, aside from the Spanish Jews, later to be replaced by a predominately English and Irish white population. By the 1670s, Jamaica had brought in more African slaves to work on sugar plantations, which then made up the majority of the island’s  population. During the First Maroon War, Jamaicans who escaped from slavery fought against British colonialists, leading to another decline in Jamaica's white population.

The white population would dramatically decrease during the 1800s; whites would end up comprising only 4% of the population, at most, during the ongoing white exodus from Jamaica.

According to the 2011 Census of Population and Housing for Jamaica, 0.2% of Jamaica's population is considered white. Over half of the white population lives in the Saint Andrew Parish. Seeing as about 4% of Jamaica's population is considered mixed (mostly black and white), the population of those with partial European ancestry is much higher than that of the solely white population.

There is also a several-centuries-old emigration tradition of white Jamaicans (as with Jamaicans in general) to the United States, Canada, the United Kingdom, and other countries.

Terminology
A number of Jamaicans have light skin, European features, and majority European ancestry. In colonial times it was common for such people to identify simply as "white", but since independence it has been more common for them to identify as "brown" or "mulatto". For instance, four of the first six Jamaican heads of government (Norman Manley, Alexander Bustamante, Edward Seaga, and Michael Manley) had a light-skinned appearance and majority European ancestry, but were not generally considered "white" within Jamaica. Foreign writers applying their own countries' racial standards would sometimes identify them as white – writing for The New York Times, Nicholas Kristof observed that a "95 per cent black population elected a white man – Edward Seaga – as its prime minister". Seaga was born to a Lebanese father and a mixed-race mother.

Demographic history
The proportion of white people among the overall population in Jamaica has varied considerably since the establishment of a permanent Spanish settlement in 1509 by Juan de Esquivel. The native Taíno people were virtually extinct by 1600 and the island's population of about 3,000 was then overwhelmingly European. However, over the next century a significant numbers of African slaves were brought to the island. Jamaica became a colony of England in 1655 and a census in 1662 recorded 3,653 whites (87% of the population) and 552 blacks (13% of the population). However, by 1673 there were 7,768 whites (45% of the population) and 9,504 blacks (55% of the population). By the end of the century only about 7,000 out of a total population of 47,000 (or 15%) were white. Most white immigrants were British, many coming voluntarily from other North American colonies or as refugees from colonies like Montserrat and Suriname, which were captured by other European powers.

By 1734, the proportion of white people had decreased to below 10% of the overall population of Jamaica. In 1774, Edward Long estimated that a third of Jamaica's white population were Scottish, mostly concentrated in Westmoreland Parish. In 1787, there were only 12,737 whites out of a total population of 209,617. There was a flow of French refugees to Jamaica after the Haitian Revolution, though not all remained in the country. In the 1830s, over 1,000 Germans immigrated to Jamaica to work on Lord Seaford's estate. The 1844 census showed a white population of 15,776 out of a total population of 377,433 (around 4%). According to the 1871 census, at least 25% of the population was coloured (having mixed black and white ancestry).

The 1960 census recorded a white population of 0.77 percent, which decreased to 0.66 in 1970, 0.18 in 2001, and 0.16 in 2011. As with most Anglo-Caribbean countries, most Jamaicans who are of mixed ancestry self-report as 'black'. In 2011, the CIA World Factbook estimated that the population of Jamaicans who are of mixed European and African ancestry is at about 96%.

White Jamaicans

Gerry Alexander (1928–2011), West Indies cricket captain
Peter Beckford (junior) (1672–1735), politician
William Beckford (1709–1770), plantation owner, Lord Mayor of London
Martine Beswick (b. 1941), actress, Bond girl
Cindy Breakspeare (b. 1954), model, Miss World 1976
Lady Colin Campbell (b. 1949), socialite and writer
Frederic G. Cassidy (1907–2000), editor of the Dictionary of Jamaican English and the Dictionary of American Regional English
Alexander J. Dallas (1759–1817), U.S. Secretary of the Treasury
George Ellis (1753–1815), writer
Gloria Escoffery (1923–2002), painter
Henry Fowler (1915–2007), educator, chairman of the Jamaica Broadcasting Corporation
Guy Harvey (b. 1955), conservationist and artist
Perry Henzell (1936–2006), film director
Lewis Hutchinson (1733–1773), serial killer
Samantha J (b. 1996), Singer
Agnes Macdonald, 1st Baroness Macdonald of Earnscliffe 
Fraser McConnell (b. 1998), national rally driver
Francis Moncrieff Kerr-Jarrett (1885–1968), businessman
William Knibb (1803–1845), Baptist missionary, first white man to receive Jamaican Order of Merit
Karl Nunes (1894–1958), inaugural West Indies cricket captain and president of the West Indies Cricket Board of Control
Edward Long (1734–1813), writer, author of the History of Jamaica
Edna Manley (1900–1987), sculptor and mother of Prime Minister Michael Manley
Justin Masterson (born to American parents in Kingston, after a few years raised in the US)
Evelyn O'Callaghan (b. 1954), professor of West Indian literature at the University of the West Indies
Sean Paul (Recording Artist)
Arthur William Savage (May 13, 1857 – September 22, 1938) Founder of Savage Arms and Inventor of radial tires as well as new production methods.
Adam Stewart (b. 1981), businessman
Gordon "Butch" Stewart (1941–2021), businessman, founder of Sandals Resorts and Beaches Resorts
Cicely Williams (1893–1992), medical researcher, discoverer of kwashiorkor

See also

Spanish Jamaicans
Germans in Jamaica
Irish people in Jamaica
Scottish Jamaicans
History of the Jews in Jamaica
Lebanese Jamaicans
White people
Jamaicans
Jamaicans of English descent
French immigration to Jamaica

References

 
Ethnic groups in Jamaica
 
White Caribbean